Amphisbaena sanctaeritae is a species of amphisbaenian in the family Amphisbaenidae. The species is endemic to Brazil.

Etymology
The specific name, sanctaeritae, refers to the type locality, Santa Rita do Passa Quatro.

Geographic range
A. sanctaeritae is found in the Brazilian State of São Paulo.

Reproduction
A. sanctaeritae is oviparous.

References

Further reading
Costa HC, Velasquez S, Zaher H, Garcia PCA (2019). "Updated Diagnosis of Amphisbaena metallurga and A. sanctaeritae and First Record of A. hiata in Brazil (Squamata: Amphisbaenidae)". South American Journal of Herpetology 14 (3): 233–241.
Vanzolini P (1994). "New species of Amphisbaena from State of São Paulo, Brasil". Papéis Avulsos de Zoologia, Museu de Zoologia da Universidade de São Paulo 39 (3): 29–32. (Amphisbaena sanctaeritae, new species).

sanctaeritae
Reptiles described in 1994
Endemic fauna of Brazil
Reptiles of Brazil
Taxa named by Paulo Vanzolini